Pema Dorji (Dzongkha:  དྲུང་འཚོ་པདྨ་རྡོ་རྗེ; 5 July 1985) is the Bhutanese football manager. A former international player, he made his first appearance for the Bhutan national football team in 2005.

Pema served as assistant coach to Japanese coach Norio Tsukitate during the first games of the Second Round of the Asian qualifiers for the 2018 FIFA World Cup until Tsukitate tenure ended following a dispute with the team manager during the Bhutan-Maldives World Cup qualifiers match on October 8, 2015. Pema guided the team as interim coach in Bhutan's next match against Hong Kong on October 13, 2015.

References

Bhutanese footballers
Bhutan international footballers
Transport United F.C. players
Yeedzin F.C. players
Living people
1985 births
Association football defenders